The 2004 National Pro Fastpitch season was the first season of professional softball under the name National Pro Fastpitch (NPF) for  the only professional women's fastpitch softball league in the United States.  From 1997 to 2002, NPF operated under the names Women's Pro Fastpitch (WPF) and Women's Pro Softball League (WPSL).   Each year, the playoff teams battle for the Cowles Cup.

Teams, cities and stadiums

Milestones and events
The 2004 season was the culmination of years of work to relaunch the Women's Pro Softball League (WPSL) as a new league.  In November 2002 the new name for WPSL - National Pro Fastpitch - was announced, along with a 2003 tour and league play beginning in 2004.

NPF initially announced a league roster of teams in Akron, Ohio (Akron Racers), Denver, Colo.(Colorado Altitude), Houston and San Antonio, Texas (Texas Thunder and San Antonio Armadillos), Sacramento, Calif. (California Sunbirds), Tucson, Ariz. (Arizona Heat), Lowell, Mass. (New England Riptide), and Parsippany, NJ (NY/NJ Juggernaut).  The Racers were the only NPF team that also played in the WPSL.  NPF conducted its first player drafts with these eight teams.

In March 2004, NPF released its inaugural schedule for 2004 and did not include the Armadillos and the Altitude.  Reports allowed for the possibility of both teams joining the league in 2005 or later, but it never came to be.

NPF officially launched its first season on June 1, 2004, with three games: the Akron Racers at the Texas Thunder, the Arizona Heat visiting the California Sunbirds, and the New England Riptide at the New York/New Jersey Juggernaut.

Player acquisition

College draft

NPF held tryouts and its first drafts at the 2003 National Fastpitch Coaches Association (NFCA) Convention, at the Del Lago Resort, in Montgomery, Texas December 3–6, 2003.

On December 6 at the 2004 NPF Draft, the eight NPF teams selected players in a four-round Elite Draft and a six-round College Senior Draft. San Antonio selected Michigan State first baseman, and Indiana assistant coach Stacey Phillips with the first overall selection in the Elite Draft. In the College Senior Draft Iyhia McMichael of Mississippi State was selected first by the Akron Racers.

After the decision was made to launch the 2004 season without the Colorado Altitude and San Antonio Armadillos, a Supplemental Draft was held to allocate players whose rights were held by Colorado and San Antonio.

Notable transactions

The Juggernaut signed Michele Smith, a two-time Olympic gold medal pitcher (1996 and 2000), and five-time Japan Pro League MVP. 
The Racers brought on board  Danielle Henderson, a member of the 2000 gold medal Olympic team.

League standings 
Source:

NPF Championship

The 2004 NPF Championship Series was held at Firestone Stadium in Akron, Ohio August 25-9.  The top four teams qualified and were seeded based on the final standings.  The Racers won the tiebreaker over the Riptide based on winning the head-to-head season series 8-4. All series were planned to be best-of-three games, but that changed when rain cancelled the game 1 of the final on August 28.  A single winner-take-all game was played on August 29.

Championship Game

Annual awards
Source:

NPF All-Star Teams

The 2004 NPF All-Star Series was held July 13 and 14 at Don E. Porter Hall of Fame Stadium in Oklahoma City, OK.  The East All-Star team included players from NY/NJ Juggernaut, the New England Riptide, and the Akron Racers and was managed by the Racers' Judy Martino. The West All-Star team included players from California Sunbirds, the Arizona Heat, and the Texas Thunder and was managed by the Thunder's Wayne Daigle.

The USA Olympic softball team played a doubleheader against each NPF All-Star Team on July 13.  The Olympians swept the games beating the East 5-0, and edging the West 5-3 in 9 innings.
The West All-Stars beat the East by a score of 1-0 on July 14.  Nancy Evans was named the Most Valuable Player.

All-Star Game note

See also

 List of professional sports leagues
 List of professional sports teams in the United States and Canada

References

External links 
 

Softball teams
2004 in women's softball
2004 in American women's sports
Softball in the United States